Fabio Capelleto was a Roman Catholic prelate who served as Bishop of Lacedonia (1551–1565).

Biography
On 24 Jul 1551, he was appointed during the papacy of Pope Julius III as Bishop of Lacedonia.
On 24 Feb 1555, he was consecrated bishop by Giovanni Michele Saraceni, Archbishop of Acerenza e Matera, with Ascanio Ferreri, Bishop Emeritus of Montepeloso, and Fabio Mirto Frangipani, Bishop of Caiazzo, serving as co-consecrators. 
He served as Bishop of Lacedonia until his resignation in 1565.

References

External links and additional sources
 (for Chronology of Bishops) 
 (for Chronology of Bishops) 

16th-century Italian Roman Catholic bishops
Bishops appointed by Pope Julius III